Bidhan Chandra College, also known as B.C.College, Asansol,  established in 1961, is the well known college in Asansol, Paschim Bardhaman district. It offers undergraduate courses in arts, commerce and sciences. It is affiliated to  Kazi Nazrul University, Asansol.

Departments

Science

Chemistry
Physics
Mathematics
Zoology
Computer Science

Arts and Commerce

Bengali
English
Sanskrit
Hindi
Urdu
History
Geography
Political Science
Philosophy
Economics
Commerce

Professional Sudies
BBA
BCA

Accreditation
In 2017 the college was awarded B grade by the National Assessment and Accreditation Council (NAAC). The college is recognized by the University Grants Commission (UGC).

See also

References

External links
Bidhan Chandra College, Asansol
Kazi Nazrul University
University Grants Commission
National Assessment and Accreditation Council

Colleges affiliated to Kazi Nazrul University
Educational institutions established in 1961
Universities and colleges in Paschim Bardhaman district
Education in Asansol
1961 establishments in West Bengal